Agathotoma angusta is an extinct species of sea snail, a marine gastropod mollusk in the family Mangeliidae.

Distribution
This extinct marine species has been found in Pliocene and Tertiary strata in Lombardy, Italy.

References

 Ceulemans, L.; Van Dingenen, F.; Landau B. M. (2018). The lower Pliocene gastropods of Le Pigeon Blanc (Loire-Atlantique, northwest France). Part 5 – Neogastropoda (Conoidea) and Heterobranchia (fine). Cainozoic Research. 18(2): 89-176

External links
 Bellardi, Luigi. Monografia delle Pleurotome fossili del Piemonte. Stamperia reale, 1847
 Cossmann M. (1895-1924). Essais de paléoconchologie comparée. Paris, published by the author. Part 1: 1-159, pl. 1-7 [1895. Part 2: 1-179, pl. 1-8 [1896]. Part 3: 1-201, pl. 1-8 [1899]. Part 4: 1-293, pl. 1-10 [1901]. Part 6: 1-261, pl. 1-7 [1904]. Part 7: 1-261, pl. 1-14 [1906]. Part 8: 1-248, pl. 1-4 [1909]. Part 9: 1-248, pl. 1-4 [1912]. Part 10: 1-292, pl. 1-12 [1916]. Part 11: 1-388, pls 1-11 [1918]. Part 12: 1-348, pls 1-10 [1921]. Part 13: 1-345, pls 1-12 [1924] (2ème livraison), p. 1-179]

angusta
Gastropods described in 1847